The Venezuelan National Road Race Championships are held annually, and are governed by the Venezuelan Cycling Federation (in Spanish: Federación Venezolana de Ciclismo). The event also includes the Venezuelan National Road Race Championships.

Multiple winners

Men

Women

Men

Elite

Women

Elite

See also
Venezuelan National Road Race Championships
National road cycling championships

References

National Time Trial Championships
National road cycling championships
Cycling